Eucallopistus is a genus of beetles in the family Buprestidae, containing the following species:

 Eucallopistus carteri (Kerremans, 1908)
 Eucallopistus castelnaudii (Deyrolle, 1864)
 Eucallopistus moultoni (Kerremans, 1910)
 Eucallopistus purpuriceps (Thery, 1923)
 Eucallopistus triangularis (Kerremans, 1909)

References

Buprestidae genera